Ng Ka Fung (born 27 October 1992) is a Hong Kong sprinter. He competed in the 4 × 100 m relay event at the 2012 Summer Olympics.

References

External links 
IAAF athlete profile
Damond League athlete profile

Hong Kong male sprinters
1992 births
Living people
Olympic athletes of Hong Kong
Athletes (track and field) at the 2012 Summer Olympics
Athletes (track and field) at the 2014 Asian Games
Athletes (track and field) at the 2018 Asian Games
World Athletics Championships athletes for Hong Kong
Asian Games medalists in athletics (track and field)
Asian Games bronze medalists for Hong Kong
Medalists at the 2014 Asian Games